"Go Gopher Victory" is one of the school songs of the University of Minnesota.  Composed in 1925 by University graduate Addison H. Douglass, this tune was originally entitled "The Gopher M".  It is frequently played at Minnesota Golden Gopher athletic events by the University of Minnesota Marching Band.

Lyrics

References

External links
Go Gopher Victory as performed by the University of Minnesota Marching Band

1925 songs